The 1930 Alabama gubernatorial election took place on November 4, 1930, in order to elect the governor of Alabama. Democratic incumbent Bibb Graves was term-limited, and could not  seek a second consecutive term.

Democratic primary
At the time this election took place, Alabama, as with most other southern states, was solidly Democratic, and the Republican Party had such diminished influence that the Democratic primary was the de facto contest for state offices; a candidate who won the Democratic primary was all but assured of winning the general election.

Results

Results

References

1930
gubernatorial
Alabama
November 1930 events